The Cure are an English alternative rock band from Crawley. Formed in May 1978, the group originally consisted of vocalist, guitarist and keyboardist Robert Smith (the only constant member), bassist Michael Dempsey and drummer Lol Tolhurst. The current lineup includes Smith, bassist Simon Gallup (from 1979 to 1982, and since 1984), keyboardist Roger O'Donnell (from 1987 to 1990, 1995 to 2005, and since 2011), guitarist and keyboardist Perry Bamonte (from 1990 to 2005, and since 2022), drummer Jason Cooper (since 1995) and guitarist Reeves Gabrels (since 2012).

History
The Cure formed in May 1978, evolving from the previous outfits Malice and Easy Cure. The band's original incarnation featured vocalist and guitarist Robert Smith, bassist Michael Dempsey and drummer Lol Tolhurst. After the release and promotion of Three Imaginary Boys, Dempsey was replaced by Simon Gallup in November 1979, when keyboardist Matthieu Hartley also joined the band. Hartley performed on Seventeen Seconds, but by August 1980 had left the band. Keyboards on Faith and Pornography were performed by Smith, Gallup and Tolhurst. Following the end of the Pornography touring cycle in June 1982, Gallup left the Cure and the band was placed on a temporary hiatus. Later in the year, Smith and Tolhurst – now the band's keyboardist – returned with the single "Let's Go to Bed".

After several performances with stand-in musicians, the Cure returned in 1983 with new bassist Phil Thornalley and drummer Andy Anderson. Former Malice and Easy Cure guitarist Porl Thompson performed saxophone on the 1984 album The Top, before returning to the group on a full-time basis on guitar and keyboards. During the Top World Tour, Anderson was fired from the band due to problems stemming from alcohol abuse; he was briefly replaced by Vince Ely and later by Boris Williams, the latter of whom was subsequently offered the position full-time. Thornalley also left the band upon the tour's conclusion, replaced by the returning Gallup. The five-piece lineup of Smith, Thompson, Gallup, Williams and Tolhurst released two studio albums: 1985's The Head on the Door and 1987's Kiss Me, Kiss Me, Kiss Me.

For the tour in support of Kiss Me, Kiss Me, Kiss Me, the Cure added Roger O'Donnell as a second keyboardist. Tolhurst eventually left the band entirely, after limited contributions to both Kiss Me, Kiss Me, Kiss Me and its follow-up Disintegration. His departure was announced in April 1989, when Smith claimed that he "wasn't taking it seriously enough". O'Donnell remained only until the following June, when he left due to "personal differences" and was replaced by the band's guitar technician Perry Bamonte. The new lineup released Wish in 1992, before Thompson left in early 1993 and Bamonte took over as main guitarist. The Cure spent much of 1994 on hiatus, as Smith was involved in a legal dispute with former bandmate Tolhurst. By the time they returned to the studio later in the year, Williams had left.

In spring 1995, the Cure commenced recording for their next album with new drummer Jason Cooper and returning keyboardist O'Donnell. This lineup remained active for ten years, releasing three studio albums and one live collection, before Bamonte and O'Donnell were dismissed in May 2005. The keyboardist later claimed that Smith would be reducing the Cure back to a three-piece, with Bamonte and himself the two members culled from the lineup. The remaining trio recorded a cover of John Lennon's "Love" for the Amnesty International album Make Some Noise, before Porl Thompson returned for summer tour dates starting in July.

In May and November 2011, the band performed a series of shows with former members Tolhurst and O'Donnell as special guests, although Thompson was not included. On 1 May 2012, after not performing with the band since 2009, Thompson announced that he was no longer a member of the Cure. He was replaced for subsequent tour dates by Reeves Gabrels, who became an official member after a few shows.

In 2019, Eden Gallup filled in on bass guitar for two shows when his father, Simon Gallup, was prevented from playing, due to personal circumstances.

On October 6, 2022 Perry Bamonte returned to the lineup on the first show of the Lost World Tour in Riga, Latvia.

Members

Current

Former

Substitute performers

Timeline

Lineups

References

External links
The Cure official website

Cure, The